The Thomas W. Phillips Memorial is a historic building in Nashville, Tennessee, United States, owned by Vanderbilt University. It was home to the Disciples of Christ Historical Society until the building was purchased by Vanderbilt in 2015. It was built in 1956. It has been listed on the National Register of Historic Places since November 9, 2006.

References

Properties of religious function on the National Register of Historic Places in Tennessee
Gothic Revival architecture in Tennessee
Buildings and structures completed in 1956
Buildings and structures in Nashville, Tennessee